South Twigg Township is one of twelve townships in Hamilton County, Illinois, USA.  As of the 2010 census, its population was 132 and it contained 71 housing units.  It was formed from a portion of Twigg Township.

Geography

Unincorporated towns
 Walpole at 
(This list is based on USGS data and may include former settlements.)

Cemeteries
The township contains these two cemeteries: Barker and Roberts.

Demographics

School districts
 Eldorado Community Unit School District 4
 Galatia Community Unit School District 1
 Hamilton County Community Unit School District 10

Political districts
 Illinois's 19th congressional district
 State House District 118
 State Senate District 59

References
 
 United States Census Bureau 2009 TIGER/Line Shapefiles
 United States National Atlas

External links
 City-Data.com
 Illinois State Archives
 Township Officials of Illinois
 Hamilton County Historical Society

Townships in Hamilton County, Illinois
Mount Vernon, Illinois micropolitan area
Townships in Illinois